Calden is a municipality in the district of Kassel in Hesse, Germany. It is located 12 km northwest of the city of Kassel, and the Kassel Airport is situated near Calden.

Schloss Wilhelmsthal
 
Schloss Wilhelmsthal is a Baroque château located to the south of Calden. It was built in the mid 18th century for William VIII, Landgrave of Hesse-Kassel according to plans by François de Cuvilliés.

References

External links 

Kassel (district)